Oytak Town is a town of Akto County in Xinjiang Uygur Autonomous Region, China. Located in the middle of the northeast of the county, the town covers an area of 1,537 square kilometers with a population of 5,093 (as of 2017). It has 4 villages with 16 villagers' groups under its jurisdiction, its seat is at Tokkuzotak.

Name

The name of Oytak is from Kyrgyz language, meaning "sunken ravine", or "a lowland in mountains" from the old Turkic language. It is named after the geologically famous Oytak Valley in the land. The name of the town is also spelled Oytag.

Geography

The town of Oytak is located between 75°58′～76°03′ east longitude and 39°12′- 39°16′ north latitude, 50 kilometers southwest of the county seat Akto Town. The Karakoram Highway runs through the town north to south, with convenient transportation. The area has a maximum length of 58 kilometers from west to east, a maximum length of 52 kilometers from north to south, and a total area of 1,537 square kilometers. Oytak is a semi-agricultural and semi-pastoral town with an area of 842.58 hectares of arable land, 49.21 hectares of orchard and 48.92 hectares of forest land. Oytak is a temperate continental dry climate with cool weather. The annual average temperature is 7.8 °C, the average temperature in January is −8.1 °C, the average temperature in July is 20.8 °C, and the frost-free period is 130–200 days.

Resources

The main water system is the Gez River, the water resources are richer in the town. The town's economy is dominated by animal husbandry, and farming and animal husbandry are run. The land on both sides of the Gez River Valley is more fertile and flat. The main crops are wheat and corn. There are precious animals such as snow chicken and mongolian gazelle in the territory, and there are mineral resources such as iron, copper, gold, coal, oil shale, limestone, gypsum, clay and zeolite. The tourism resources are well-known Auyitagh Forest Park, with glaciers, scenery and cool climate.

Administrative divisions
The town has 4 villages under its jurisdiction.

4 administration villages
 Atoynak
 Oytak
 Pilal
 Qalmaerik

 Unincorporated villages  
 Tokkuzotak
 Oytag aygzu

References 

Township-level divisions of Akto County